Luis Borroto Jiménez (born August 24, 1982 in Sagua la Grande, Villa Clara Province, Cuba) is a Cuban baseball player. A starting pitcher with Villa Clara of the Cuban National Series, Borroto competed internationally with the Cuba national baseball team at the 2004 Summer Olympics and the 2006 World Baseball Classic.

References

External links

External links
 

1982 births
Living people
People from Sagua la Grande
Olympic baseball players of Cuba
Baseball players at the 2004 Summer Olympics
Olympic gold medalists for Cuba
2006 World Baseball Classic players
Olympic medalists in baseball
Medalists at the 2004 Summer Olympics